Mollalu may refer to:
Mollalu, Germi, Ardabil Province
Mollalu, Meshgin Shahr, Ardabil Province
Mollalu, Ahar, East Azerbaijan Province
Mollalu, Kaleybar, East Azerbaijan Province